Vestibule or Vestibulum can have the following meanings, each primarily based upon a common origin, from early 17th century French, derived from Latin vestibulum, -i n. "entrance court".

Anatomy
In general, vestibule is a small space or cavity at the beginning of a canal.
 The vulval vestibule is a part of the vulva between the labia minora into which the urinary meatus (urethral opening) and the vaginal opening open
 The nasal vestibule is the nostrils, simply lined with an extension of skin epithelium, in contrast to nasal cavity, which is lined with respiratory epithelium
 The vestibule of the ear is the central part of the inner ear labyrinth, as used in the vestibular system
The vestibulocochlear nerve connects this to the brain
 The vestibule of larynx is between the epiglottis and rima glottidis
 The aortic vestibule is the part of the left ventricle of the heart just below the aortic valve
 The vestibule of mouth is the space between the lips (or cheek) and teeth

Architecture

 an entryway
 a lobby, entrance hall, or passage between the outer door and the interior of a building
a porch
 an enclosed area between two railroad cars
 a reception area
 an antechamber 
 an entry room
 a passageway acting as an airlock between two environments

Related:
 a covered section between the outer opening and inner opening of a tent, typically used for the storage of boots, packs and small equipment

Other
 The Dleskovec Plateau, a plateau in northern Slovenia
 The Vestibule of Hell, in Dante's Inferno
 Articulated bus
 The jet bridge, a connector from an airport gate to an airplane, allowing passengers to board and disembark
 The Corridor connection between two railway passenger coaches